Scott Fauble (born November 5, 1991) is an American long distance runner. His best marathon time is 2:08:52. He is the co-author of Inside a Marathon: An All-Access Pass to a Top-10 Finish at NYC. Fauble explains how testing blood levels in Boulder has benefited his training in 2022.

Early life
Fauble graduated from Wheat Ridge High School as a 2-time CHSAA state champion.
He ran the Boulder Bolder in 2003 at age 11 in a time of 42:50.

NCAA Portland Pilots
Fauble graduated from University of Portland as a 4-time NCAA Division 1 All-American where he received student athlete of the year and All American honors and led the 2014 cross country team to a third place finish.

Pro career
Fauble turned professional in 2015 and raced for Hoka's Northern Arizona Elite team before departing at the end of 2021. He was part of A Time and Place which documented the team' runners in the lead up to the Olympic Trials.

2016
On April 30, Fauble placed 2nd in US Half Marathon Championship hosted by Columbus Marathon.
He also qualified for the Olympic Trials in the 10,000 meter distance, where he placed fourth.

2017
In October 2017, Fauble finished 9th in the Frankfurt Marathon in a time of 2:12:35.

2018
On March 28, Fauble finished 5th in the New York City Half Marathon in 1:02:58.

On September 9, Fauble finished 4th in the Great North West Half Marathon in 1:02:18.

On November 4, Fauble finished 7th in the 2018 New York City Marathon in 2:12:28.

This was the year his Inside a Marathon, with coach Ben Rosario, was published. It told the story of how elites plan and train for a goal race.

2019
In February, Fauble won the Gasparilla Classic, his first win in four years.
Fauble finished 7th in the 2019 Boston Marathon, as the first American and with a personal best of 2:09:09.

2020
Prior to the COVID-19 pandemic, Fauble finished 12th at the 2020 Olympic Trials.

Competition record

Personal bests

References

External links 

 
 Scott Faulble profile Portland Pilots

Living people
1991 births
21st-century American male writers
American male long-distance runners
American male marathon runners
American male cross country runners
People from Colorado
Sportspeople from the Denver metropolitan area
Track and field athletes from Colorado
University of Portland alumni